Bushland High School is a 3A high school located in Bushland, Texas (USA). It is part of the Bushland Independent School District located in southwestern Potter County.  In 2014, the school was rated "Met Standard" by the Texas Education Agency.

The Falcons are in the following UIL Districts

Athletics
The Bushland Falcons compete in the following sports:

Cross Country, Volleyball, Football, Wrestling, Basketball, Golf, Track & Field, Bowling, Softball & Baseball

State Titles
Volleyball 
2007(2A)
2008(2A)
2013(2A)
2016(4A)
2020(3A)
2021(3A)
Girls Cross Country 
2012(2A)

State Finalist
Football
2009(2A/D2)
Baseball
2010(2A)
2011(2A)
2012(2A)
Volleyball
2015 (4A), 2022(3A)

State Semifinalist
Basketball
2014(2A)
Baseball
2011(2A)

Music Department

Bushland Falcon Band
Marching
State Contest
2013 – 11th place (2A)
2021 - 20th place (3A)
Area Contest
2014 - 5th(Prelims)-tied for 5th(Finals) (4A)
 2016 - 2nd(Prelims) 5th(Finals) (4A)
 2019 - 4th(Prelims) 4th(Finals)
2021 - 2nd(Prelims) 3rd(Finals)
2022 - 7th(Prelims) 4th(Finals)
Sweepstakes
2022(3A)
2021(3A)
2020(3A)
2019(3A)
2018(3A)
2017(4A)
2016(4A)
2015(4A)
2014(2A)
2013(2A)
2012(2A)
2011(2A)
2010(2A)
2009(2A)
2008(2A)
2007(2A)

Choir
Sweepstakes
2014(2A)

Notable alumni
Weston Richburg, Former NFL player, San Francisco 49ers, New York Giants
Crocket Gillmore, Former NFL player, Baltimore Ravens
Taylor Cornelius, CFL Player, Edmonton Elks

References

External links
Bushland ISD

Schools in Potter County, Texas
Public high schools in Texas
2005 establishments in Texas
Educational institutions established in 2005